Microgadus tomcod, also commonly known as frostfish, Atlantic tomcod or winter cod, is a type of cod found in North American coastal waters from the Gulf of St. Lawrence, St. Lawrence River and northern Newfoundland, south to Virginia.

The fishing season of the tomcod varies by location—one known example is the Sainte-Anne River in Quebec, where its season is from late-December to mid-February. A bimonitoring program tracked hormone levels of Atlantic tomcod caught near Miramichi and Kouchibouguac in 1993 and 1994, demonstrating that the preparatory period for spawning began in September
with maximal steroid levels in November, and spawning took place from late December to January.  The town of Sainte-Anne-de-la-Pérade is notable for its fishing village built on the frozen waters of the Ste-Anne, playing host to the scores of fishermen visiting the town to fish for the species.

After General Electric dumped polychlorinated biphenyls (PCBs) in the Hudson River from 1947 through 1976, tomcod living in the river were found to have developed an increased resistance to the compound's toxic effects. Scientists identified the genetic mutation that conferred the resistance, and found that the mutated form was present in 99 percent of the tomcods in the river, compared to fewer than 10 percent of the tomcods from other waters.

Taxonomy 
The Atlantic tomcod is one of two species in the Microgadus genus, the other being Microgadus proximus, the Pacific tomcod.

In popular media 

In the 2016 movie Atomic Shark (also known as Saltwater), the San Diego lifeguard investigating numerous shark attacks suggests that there's an "environmental disaster" underway.  As part of her claim she references the "Tomcod" which mutated due to toxic waste dumped in the Hudson River.

Similarly, in the 1975 movie Jaws, when Quint (portrayed by Robert Shaw) makes his offer to the townspeople to catch and kill the shark, he says "You know how I earn a living... bad fish ... Not like going down to the pond and chasing bluegills or tommy-cods."

Gallery

References

External links
 Microgadus tomcod
 Poisson des chenaux page with recipes

Atlantic tomcod
Saint Lawrence River
Fish of the Atlantic Ocean
Fauna of Atlantic Canada
Fauna of the Eastern United States
Atlantic tomcod
Taxa named by Johann Julius Walbaum